The 1912 Minnesota lieutenant gubernatorial election took place on November 5, 1912. Republican Party of Minnesota candidate J. A. A. Burnquist defeated Minnesota Democratic Party challenger Winn Powers, Public Ownership Party candidate D. M. Robertson, and Prohibition Party candidate George H. Andrews.

Results

External links
 Election Returns

Lieutenant Gubernatorial
Minnesota
1912